Harriet Alexander Field  is a public airport two miles west of Salida, in Chaffee County, Colorado, United states. It is owned by the City of Salida and Chaffee County.

Many U.S. airports use the same three-letter location identifier for the FAA and IATA, but Harriet Alexander Field is ANK (formerly 0V2) to the FAA and SLT to the IATA (which assigned ANK to Etimesgut Airport in Ankara, Turkey).

Facilities
 6/24: 7,347 x 75 ft (2,239 x 23 m), surface: asphalt
 H1: 36 x 36 ft (11 x 11 m), surface: concrete

In the year ending April 20, 2006 the airport had 9,653 aircraft operations, 99.5% general aviation and 0.5% military.

References

External links 
 Airport page at Chaffee County website
 Airport page at City of Salida website
 Harriet Alexander Field at Colorado DOT airport directory
 
 

Airports in Colorado
Transportation buildings and structures in Chaffee County, Colorado